María Morena is a 1951 Spanish drama film directed by José María Forqué and Pedro Lazaga. It was entered into the 1952 Cannes Film Festival.

Cast
 Paquita Rico - María Morena
 José María Mompín - Fernando (as José Mª Mompin)
 Rafael Luis Calvo - Cristóbal
 Félix de Pomés - Juan Montoya
 Alfonso Muñoz - Don Chirle
 Consuelo de Nieva - María Pastora
 Purita Alonso
 Julio Riscal - Relámpago
 Francisco Rabal - El Sevillano
 Luis Induni - Romero
 Carlos Ronda - Sargento
 Modesto Cid - Primer anciano en taberna

References

External links

1951 films
1950s Spanish-language films
1951 drama films
Films directed by José María Forqué
Films directed by Pedro Lazaga
Spanish drama films
1950s Spanish films